AIPA may refer to:

 All India Pickleball Association
 American Inventors Protection Act
 Arabic International Phonetic Alphabet
 ASEAN Inter Parliamentary Assembly
 Australian and International Pilots Association
 Azienda Italiana Petroli Albanesi